The following article is a summary of the 2014 football season in Kenya, which is the 51st competitive season in its history.

The announcement of the men's under-17 national team's failure to participate in their 2015 African U-17 Championship qualification match against South Sudan was met very negatively by Kenyan football fans, and questioned the administration of current Football Kenya Federation president Sam Nyamweya.

Domestic leagues

Changes in the football league system

On 10 July 2013, it was announced that the Football Kenya Federation introduced a new league system to take effect from the beginning of the season. This involved the introduction and scrapping of a few leagues, and the re-organisation of the system. For the 2015 season, the Kenyan Premier League will be contested by 18 teams.

Promotion and relegation

Promoted to Premier League
 Kenya Revenue Authority
 Top Fry AllStars

Promoted from FKF Division One

 Administration Police
 Agrochemical
 Bidco United
 Busia United Stars
 FC Talanta
 Finlays Horticulture
 G.F.C. 105
 Hotsprings FC
 Kariobangi Sharks
 Ligi Ndogo
 Mahakama

 Modern Coast Rangers
 MOYAS
 Nairobi Stima
 Nakumatt
 Nzoia United
 Oserian
 Posta Rangers
 Shabana
 St. Joseph
 West Kenya Sugar
 Zoo Kericho

Relegated from Premier League
 Kakamega Homeboyz
 Karuturi Sports

Remaining in Division One

 Admiral
 Alaskan
 Brighter Stars
 Coast United
 Comply
 FC West Ham United
 Field Negroes
 Green Berets
 Gusii Raiders
 Jericho AllStars
 Kambakia Christian Centre
 Kibera Celtic

 Kisero
 Kisumu Municipal
 Kolongolo
 Longonot Horticulture
 Mount Kenya United
 Mumbi Nationale
 Mumcop
 Sparki Youth
 Suam Orchards
 Timsales
 Utawala
 Vihiga Stars

Premier League

The 2014 Kenyan Premier League season began on 15 February and ended on 8 November.

National Super League

The 2014 Kenyan National Super League season began on 15 March and concluded on 2 November.

Zone A

Zone B

Domestic cups

President's Cup

The 2014 FKF President's Cup began on 26 April and ended on 15 November.

Super Cup
The 2014 Kenyan Super Cup match to be contested by 2013 Kenyan Premier League champions Gor Mahia and the 2013 FKF President's Cup champions A.F.C. Leopards was cancelled by the Football Kenya Federation due to a lack of sponsors.

Top 8 Cup

The 2014 KPL Top 8 Cup began on 5 April and concluded on 15 June.

International club competitions

Champions League

The 2014 CAF Champions League began on 7 February and is scheduled to end on 2 November. Gor Mahia represented Kenya in the competition, having won the 2013 Kenyan Premier League.

Preliminary round
In the preliminary round, Gor Mahia faced 2012–13 Gabon Championnat National D1 champions US Bitam over two legs, played on 8 and 16 February.

1–1 on aggregate. Gor Mahia won the penalty shoot-out and advanced to the first round.

First round
In the first round, Gor Mahia faced 2012–13 Tunisian Ligue Professionnelle 1 runners-up and 2011 CAF Champions League winners Espérance de Tunis over two legs, played on 1 and 10 March. They were eliminated from the competition, having lost 8–2 on aggregate.

Confederation Cup

The 2014 CAF Confederation Cup began on 7 February and is scheduled to end on 7 December. A.F.C. Leopards represented Kenya in the competition, having won the 2013 FKF President's Cup.

Preliminary round
In the preliminary round, A.F.C. Leopards faced 2013 Ethiopian Cup champions Defence over two legs, played on 9 and 16 February.

First round
In the first round, A.F.C. Leopards faced 2012–13 Nedbank Cup runners-up SuperSport United over two legs, played on 1 and 9 March. They were eliminated from the competition, having lost 4–2 on aggregate.

Kagame Interclub Cup

The 2014 Kagame Interclub Cup began on 8 August and ended on 24 August. Gor Mahia represented Kenya in the competition.

Group stage
In the group stage, Gor Mahia were drawn in Group B alongside Ugandan club Kampala Capital City Authority, Rwandan giants A.P.R., Burundian side Atlético Olympic and Djibouti Télécom of Djibouti. They were eliminated from the competition, having garnered only 2 points from a possible 12 from 4 matches, and finished bottom of their group.

National teams

Men's senior

Africa Cup of Nations qualification
The men's senior national team participated in qualification for the 2015 Africa Cup of Nations.

First round
In the first round, Kenya faced Comoros over two legs, played on 17 and 31 May.

Second round
In the second round, Kenya faced Lesotho over two legs, played on 20 July and 3 August. Lesotho won 1–0 on aggregate and advanced to Group C in the group stage.

Friendlies
The following is a list of friendlies played by the men's senior national team in 2014.

Women's senior

African Women's Championship qualification
The women's senior national team participated in qualification for the 2014 African Women's Championship.

First round
In the first round, Kenya faced Rwanda over two legs, played on 16 February and 1 March. They were eliminated on away goals rule, after drawing 2–2 on aggregate.

2–2 on aggregate. Rwanda win on away goals.

Men's under-20

African U-20 Championship qualification
The men's national under-20 team participated in qualification for the 2015 African U-20 Championship.

First round
In the first round, Kenya faced Tanzania over two legs, played on 6 and 27 April. They were eliminated, having lost the deciding penalty shoot-out after the match ended 0–0 on aggregate.

0–0 on aggregate. Tanzania win the penalty shoot-out and advance to the second round.

Friendlies
The following is a list of friendlies (to be) played by the men's national under-20 team in 2014.

Boys' under-17

African U-17 Championship qualification
The boys' national under-17 team was to participate in qualification for the 2015 African U-17 Championship, but the Football Kenya Federation withdrew the team from the competition, citing a "lack of funds" to send the team off to compete. The announcement was met very negatively by Kenyan football fans, who questioned the administration of current FKF president Sam Nyamweya. Among the concerned parties was former FC Talanta executive director Jérôme J. Dufourg, who claimed he was jailed and then deported from Kenya after speaking out against mismanagement of funds by the FKF in 2013. This followed earlier pushes for Nyamweya's removal from several others as early as 2012, and anti-corruption investigations carried out against him and other FKF officials in 2013.

References